The Apollonia University is a private university in Iași, Romania. Founded in 1991, it was named in honor of the Saint Apollonia.

Structure
Faculties
 Faculty of Dental Medicine
 Faculty of Communication Sciences

References

External links
 

Apollonia University
Educational institutions established in 1991
1991 establishments in Romania